Samotorica is a dispersed settlement in the hills northwest of Horjul in the Inner Carniola region of Slovenia.

Name
Samotorica was first mentioned in written records in 1340 as Zamatůrnicz (and in 1489 as Samotoritz and Samatoritz). The name may be derived from the Slavic common noun *samotvorъ 'natural feature', referring to some striking landscape element, or perhaps from the hypothetical personal name *Samotvor.

Church
The local church in the settlement is dedicated to Saint Michael and belongs to the Parish of Horjul. It contains early 16th-century frescos and a painted wooden ceiling.

References

External links
Samotorica on Geopedia

Populated places in the Municipality of Horjul